Park Ridge is a borough in Bergen County, in the U.S. state of New Jersey. As of the 2020 United States census, the borough's population was 8,883, an increase of 238 (+2.8%) from the 2010 census count of 8,645, which in turn reflected a decline of 63 (−0.7%) from the 8,708 counted in the 2000 census.

History
Park Ridge was created as a borough by an act of the New Jersey Legislature on May 15, 1894, from portions of Washington Township, based on the results of a referendum held the previous day. The borough was formed during the "Boroughitis" phenomenon then sweeping through Bergen County, in which 26 boroughs were formed in the county in 1894 alone. Park Ridge obtained a portion of River Vale (July 15, 1929), exchanged portions with Woodcliff Lake (December 12, 1955), received part of Washington Township (November 26, 1956), exchanged portions with Hillsdale (February 10, 1958) and Woodcliff Lake (June 9, 1958) and received another part of Washington Township (August 11, 1958). The borough's name derives from its location.

Park Ridge's Pascack Historical Society Museum, at 19 Ridge Avenue, houses the world's only wampum drilling machine. This wooden artifact was made in Park Ridge by the Campbell Brothers who invented a way to drill through long pieces of hair pipe shells so that they could be strung and worn as breast plates by the Plains Indians, among others. Needing water for the operation, the industrious brothers leased a woolen mill that stood on the Pascack Brook. When that burned down they built their own mill farther down Pascack Creek on their land and another shop on Pascack Road near their homestead. Both buildings housed drilling machines on their second floors where they were safe from prying eyes, as the two machines had not been patented. In the early 19th century, John Jacob Astor purchased wampum from the Campbells to trade with the Native Americans of the Pacific Northwest whose beaver pelts he turned into men's hats.  The best years for the wampum business were between 1835 and 1866. The drilling machine can be seen at the Pascack Historical Society Museum on Wednesdays from 10 a.m. until noon and Sundays from 1–4 p.m. Admission is free.

Historic sites
Park Ridge is home to the following locations on the National Register of Historic Places:

 John G. Ackerson House – 142 Pascack Road  (added 1983)
 Isaac Debaun House – 124 Rivervale Road  (added 1983)
 Park Ridge Station – Hawthorne and Park Avenue  (added 1984)
 Peter D. Perry House – 107 Rivervale Road  (added 1983)
 Wortendyke Barn – 13 Pascack Road  (added 1973)
 Frederick Wortendyke House – 12 Pascack Road  (added 1983)

Geography
According to the United States Census Bureau, the borough had a total area of 2.63 square miles (6.81 km2), including 2.61 square miles (6.75 km2) of land and 0.02 square miles (0.05 km2) of water (0.80%).

The borough is a part of the Pascack Valley region of Bergen County. It is bordered by the Bergen County municipalities of Hillsdale, Montvale, River Vale and Woodcliff Lake. Although no major highways run through the borough, it is serviced by the Garden State Parkway at exits 168, 171 and 172 in Washington Township, Woodcliff Lake and Montvale, respectively.

Demographics

2010 census

The Census Bureau's 2006–2010 American Community Survey showed that (in 2010 inflation-adjusted dollars) median household income was $104,053 (with a margin of error of +/− $7,870) and the median family income was $118,984 (+/− $7,463). Males had a median income of $85,242 (+/− $13,024) versus $65,216 (+/− $12,814) for females. The per capita income for the borough was $46,695 (+/− $3,650). About 1.1% of families and 1.3% of the population were below the poverty line, including none of those under age 18 and 0.5% of those age 65 or over.

Same-sex couples headed 11 households in 2010, an increase from the 7 counted in the 2000 Census.

2000 census
As of the 2000 United States census, there were 8,708 people, 3,161 households, and 2,389 families residing in the borough. The population density was 3,353.3 people per square mile (1,293.1/km2). There were 3,258 housing units at an average density of 1,254.6 per square mile (483.8/km2). The racial makeup of the borough was 93.48% White, 0.86% African American, 0.14% Native American, 3.86% Asian, 0.02% Pacific Islander, 0.73% from other races, and 0.91% from two or more races. Hispanic or Latino people of any race were 5.32% of the population.

There were 3,161 households, out of which 33.3% had children under the age of 18 living with them, 65.9% were married couples living together, 7.5% had a female householder with no husband present, and 24.4% were non-families. 21.3% of all households were made up of individuals, and 8.2% had someone living alone who was 65 years of age or older. The average household size was 2.67 and the average family size was 3.12.

In the borough the population was spread out, with 23.5% under the age of 18, 5.6% from 18 to 24, 28.6% from 25 to 44, 26.2% from 45 to 64, and 16.2% who were 65 years of age or older. The median age was 41 years. For every 100 females, there were 92.2 males. For every 100 females age 18 and over, there were 90.4 males.

The median income for a household in the borough was $66,632, and the median income for a family was $97,294. Males had a median income of $71,042 versus $40,714 for females. The per capita income for the borough was $40,351. About 1.2% of families and 3.1% of the population were below the poverty line, including 2.3% of those under age 18 and 2.1% of those age 65 or over.

Economy
The Hertz Corporation, a car rental company, had been headquartered in Park Ridge and was the borough's largest single taxpayer. On May 7, 2013, Hertz announced that the firm was moving their corporate HQ to Estero, Florida and would keep certain operations in Park Ridge.

Sony Corporation of America maintains an R&D and engineering facility in Park Ridge.

Government

Local government
Park Ridge is governed under the Borough form of New Jersey municipal government, which is used in 218 municipalities (of the 564) statewide, making it the most common form of government in New Jersey. The governing body is comprised of a mayor and a borough council with all positions elected at-large on a partisan basis as part of the November general election. A mayor is elected directly by the voters to a four-year term of office. The borough council is comprised of six members, who are elected to serve three-year terms on a staggered basis, with two seats coming up for election each year in a three-year cycle. The borough form of government used by Park Ridge is a "weak mayor / strong council" government in which council members act as the legislative body with the mayor presiding at meetings and voting only in the event of a tie. The mayor can veto ordinances subject to an override by a two-thirds majority vote of the council. The mayor makes committee and liaison assignments for council members, and most appointments are made by the mayor with the advice and consent of the council.

, the mayor of the Borough of Park Ridge is Democrat Keith Misciagna, whose term of office ends December 31, 2023. Members of the Park Ridge Borough Council are Council President William Fenwick (R, 2023), Matthew J. Capilli (D, 2024), John M. Cozzi (R, 2023), John P. Ferguson (D, 2024), Bruce Goldsmith (R, 2025) and Greg C. Hoffman (R, 2025).

In May 2017, the council selected Keith Misciagna to fill the vacant mayoral seat, following the resignation of Terry Maguire the previous month in the face of criticism of the way he had dealt with suits over affordable housing in the borough. In turn, the council selected Michael Mintz from a list of three candidates nominated by the Democratic municipal committee to fill Misciagna's vacant council seat that expired in December 2017.

In February 2016, the Borough Council selected Donna Szot from a list of three candidates nominated by the Republican municipal committee to fill the seat expiring in December 2016 that had become vacant following the resignation of Ryan Cangialosi the previous month.

Federal, state and county representation
Park Ridge is located in the 5th Congressional District and is part of New Jersey's 39th state legislative district.

Politics
As of March 2011, there were a total of 5,800 registered voters in Park Ridge, of whom 1,462 (25.2% vs. 31.7% countywide) were registered as Democrats, 1,503 (25.9% vs. 21.1%) were registered as Republicans and 2,832 (48.8% vs. 47.1%) were registered as Unaffiliated. There were 3 voters registered as Libertarians or Greens. Among the borough's 2010 Census population, 67.1% (vs. 57.1% in Bergen County) were registered to vote, including 87.0% of those ages 18 and over (vs. 73.7% countywide).

In the 2016 presidential election, Republican Donald Trump received 2,619 votes (53.3% vs. 41.1% countywide), ahead of Democrat Hillary Clinton with 2,108 votes (42.9% vs. 54.2%) and other candidates with 185 votes (3.8% vs. 4.6%), among the 4,977 ballots cast by the borough's 6,395 registered voters, for a turnout of 77.8% (vs. 72.5% in Bergen County). In the 2012 presidential election, Republican Mitt Romney received 2,682 votes here (57.0% vs. 43.5% countywide), ahead of Democrat Barack Obama with 1,957 votes (41.6% vs. 54.8%) and other candidates with 43 votes (0.9% vs. 0.9%), among the 4,708 ballots cast by the borough's 6,080 registered voters, for a turnout of 77.4% (vs. 70.4% in Bergen County). In the 2008 presidential election, Republican John McCain received 2,735 votes here (55.8% vs. 44.5% countywide), ahead of Democrat Barack Obama with 2,093 votes (42.7% vs. 53.9%) and other candidates with 35 votes (0.7% vs. 0.8%), among the 4,901 ballots cast by the borough's 6,049 registered voters, for a turnout of 81.0% (vs. 76.8% in Bergen County). In the 2004 presidential election, Republican George W. Bush received 2,697 votes here (57.4% vs. 47.2% countywide), ahead of Democrat John Kerry with 1,963 votes (41.7% vs. 51.7%) and other candidates with 34 votes (0.7% vs. 0.7%), among the 4,702 ballots cast by the borough's 5,785 registered voters, for a turnout of 81.3% (vs. 76.9% in the whole county).

In the 2013 gubernatorial election, Republican Chris Christie received 70.6% of the vote (2,193 cast), ahead of Democrat Barbara Buono with 28.5% (886 votes), and other candidates with 0.9% (27 votes), among the 3,176 ballots cast by the borough's 5,879 registered voters (70 ballots were spoiled), for a turnout of 54.0%. In the 2009 gubernatorial election, Republican Chris Christie received 1,906 votes here (55.4% vs. 45.8% countywide), ahead of Democrat Jon Corzine with 1,317 votes (38.3% vs. 48.0%), Independent Chris Daggett with 162 votes (4.7% vs. 4.7%) and other candidates with 21 votes (0.6% vs. 0.5%), among the 3,443 ballots cast by the borough's 5,928 registered voters, yielding a 58.1% turnout (vs. 50.0% in the county).

Education
The Park Ridge Public Schools serve students in pre-kindergarten through twelfth grade. As of the 2018–19 school year, the district, comprised of three schools, had an enrollment of 1,245 students and 119.4 classroom teachers (on an FTE basis), for a student–teacher ratio of 10.4:1. Schools in the district (with 2018–19 enrollment data from the National Center for Education Statistics) are 
East Brook Elementary School with 311 students in grades K–6, 
West Ridge Elementary School with 350 students in grades Pre-K–6 and 
Park Ridge High School with 549 students in grades 7–12. The high school was the 14th-ranked public high school in New Jersey (third-highest in Bergen County) out of 328 schools statewide in New Jersey Monthly magazine's September 2012 cover story on the state's "Top Public High Schools", after being ranked 18th in 2010 out of 322 schools listed. Athletic programs at the high school include baseball, basketball, football, soccer, softball, track and tennis.

Public school students from the borough, and all of Bergen County, are eligible to attend the secondary education programs offered by the Bergen County Technical Schools, which include the Bergen County Academies in Hackensack, and the Bergen Tech campus in Teterboro or Paramus. The district offers programs on a shared-time or full-time basis, with admission based on a selective application process and tuition covered by the student's home school district.

Our Lady of Mercy Academy is a K–8 Catholic school which operates in Park Ridge under the auspices of the Roman Catholic Archdiocese of Newark.

Religion
Houses of worship in Park Ridge include:

 First Congregational Church of Park Ridge (United Church of Christ)
 Our Lady of Mercy Church
 Park Ridge United Methodist Church
 Pascack Reformed Church
 Temple Beth Sholom of Pascack Valley

Transportation

In July 2015, Park Ridge was designated as one of 30 transit villages statewide, qualifying it for incentives at the borough's train station and commuter lots, which will get additional access for bicycles and pedestrians.

Roads and highways

It is well known and posted as Kinderkamack Road, which was a trail used by the Lenape Native Americans, whose name signified that it was a place (the suffix "ack") where ceremonial dances or prayers ("kintekaye") were made.

Park Ridge can be accessed via exit 172 on the Garden State Parkway.

Public transportation
Park Ridge is served by NJ Transit on the Pascack Valley Line at the Park Ridge train station. The station is located at Hawthorne and Park Avenues though is also accessible from Broadway. This line runs north–south to Hoboken Terminal with connections via the Secaucus Junction transfer station to New Jersey Transit one-stop service to New York Penn Station and to other NJ Transit rail service. Connections are available at the Hoboken Terminal to other New Jersey Transit rail lines, the PATH train at the Hoboken PATH station, New York Waterways ferry service to the World Financial Center and other destinations and Hudson-Bergen Light Rail service.

Rockland Coaches provides service on the 11T/11AT and the 47 routes to the Port Authority Bus Terminal in Midtown Manhattan. Saddle River Tours / Ameribus provides service to the George Washington Bridge Bus Station on route 11C.

Media
PKRG-TV, the public-access television cable TV station in Park Ridge, has produced and documented many shows over its history. They continue to produce a weekly live show every Monday night in addition to broadcasting special events in the town such as parades, sporting events, school plays, and charity events. Rolf Wahl, a borough resident, provided most of the guidance, technical knowledge and foresight for the station. The studio also hosted a series of shows entitled Behind The Badge which provided residents with an insight into the way the police department works. It included a tour of the police station and police cruiser and also an overview of programs the department works on to improve the welfare of the community, e.g. anti-drug programs and computer crime awareness.

The Bear's Nest
The Bear's Nest is a luxury gated community in Park Ridge. It has town house-style houses with luxury amenities including (in some houses) elevators. A community clubhouse is available for residents, along with a pool, multiple tennis courts and a floral park. Noted residents of the development have included President Richard M. Nixon and his wife, Pat Nixon; Raymond V. Gilmartin, current Microsoft board member; and Tom Coughlin, former coach of the New York Giants and Joe Valenza,  New York Yankees Fantasy Camp Hall of Fame Inductee and Founder of Virtue Risk Partners.

Emergency services
The Tri-Boro Volunteer Ambulance Corps provides EMS service to Park Ridge, Woodcliff Lake and Montvale. Tri-Boro is a non-profit group which provides free emergency service to those in the community who need it at any time. Its headquarters is located in Park Ridge near Mill Pond.

Park Ridge has a paid police department, which has been led by Chief Joseph J. Madden since 2007.

The Park Ridge Volunteer Fire Department dates back to 1898, created by community volunteers after a major fire destroyed a local factory.

Notable people

People who were born in, residents of, or otherwise closely associated with Park Ridge include:

 Jedh Colby Barker (1945–1967), United States Marine Corps Lance Corporal who posthumously received the Medal of Honor for heroism during the Vietnam War
 Tom Coughlin (born 1946), former coach of the New York Giants and two-time Super Bowl Champion XLII XLVI
 Brian Cushing (born 1987), former linebacker for the Houston Texans
 Karen Duffy (born 1961), model and author
 George Washington Foster (1866–1923), pioneering African-American architect
 James Gandolfini (1961–2013), actor
 Raymond Gilmartin (born 1941), professor at Harvard Business School; member of the board of directors at Microsoft and General Mills; President and CEO of Merck & Co., 1994–2005
 Bill Griffeth (born 1956), financial journalist with CNBC since 1991
 Kevin Herget (born 1991), professional baseball pitcher for the Tampa Bay Rays
 Augie Hoffmann (born 1981), football player, guard signed by the New Orleans Saints and Rutgers Scarlet Knights football coach.
 Stewart Krentzman (born 1951), business executive
 Ariel Nicholson (born 2001), model and LGBT rights activist
 Pat Nixon (1912–1993), former First Lady, wife of Richard Nixon
 Richard Nixon (1913–1994), 37th President of the United States
 Tomas J. Padilla, former member of the Bergen County Board of Chosen Freeholders
 Tom Papa (born 1968), comedian, actor, writer and television/radio host
 The Roches (Maggie, Terre, and Suzzy), singer-songwriters and recording artists
 Larry Rosen (1940–2015), entrepreneur, musician and recording engineer; best known for his work as a modern jazz producer and label owner
 Stephanie Ruhle (born 1975), MSNBC Live anchor and former editor-at-large for Bloomberg News
 Travis Stever (born 1978), lead guitarist of Coheed and Cambria
 Dyanne Thorne (1936–2020), actress, stage performer and vocalist known for her stage work in Las Vegas and as the lead actress in the Ilsa film franchise which began with Ilsa, She Wolf of the SS
 Matt Turner (born 1994), goalkeeper for the US National Soccer Team and Arsenal

In popular culture
 Park Ridge was the filming site for the Nick GAS (Nickelodeon Games and Sports) segment, "Heroes of the Game". Locations included West Ridge Elementary School and Colony Field.

Annual events
 Each Memorial Day, the Tri-Boro area consisting of Park Ridge, Woodcliff Lake, and Montvale participate in the annual Memorial Day Parade. The Park Ridge High School Marching Band participates in the parade and hand out candies as well.
 Each October, Park Ridge holds its own Ragamuffin parade. Children who are 12 and younger dress up in costumes while walking down from Depot Square on Park Avenue to Davies Field. Following the parade, there is a costume contest. The event also features games and music.
 Park Ridge has an annual holiday tree lighting in December, with musical performances by the Park Ridge High School choir and Mini Maestros instrumental band and free refreshments, like popcorn and hot chocolate.

References

Sources

 Municipal Incorporations of the State of New Jersey (according to Counties) prepared by the Division of Local Government, Department of the Treasury (New Jersey); December 1, 1958.
 Clayton, W. Woodford; and Nelson, William. History of Bergen and Passaic Counties, New Jersey, with Biographical Sketches of Many of its Pioneers and Prominent Men., Philadelphia: Everts and Peck, 1882.
 Harvey, Cornelius Burnham (ed.), Genealogical History of Hudson and Bergen Counties, New Jersey. New York: New Jersey Genealogical Publishing Co., 1900.
 Van Valen, James M. History of Bergen County, New Jersey. New York: New Jersey Publishing and Engraving Co., 1900.
 Westervelt, Frances A. (Frances Augusta), 1858–1942, History of Bergen County, New Jersey, 1630–1923, Lewis Historical Publishing Company, 1923.

External links

 Park Ridge Borough website
 Park Ridge Public Schools 
 
 School Data for the Park Ridge Public Schools, National Center for Education Statistics
 Greater Pascack Valley Chamber of Commerce website
 Pascack Historical Society 
 Park Ridge Community Website
 Ridgemont Shopping Center

 
1894 establishments in New Jersey
Borough form of New Jersey government
Boroughs in Bergen County, New Jersey
Pascack Valley
Populated places established in 1894